Paris Under Watch is a 2012 French thriller film written by Audrey Diwan and Arnaud Duprey and directed by Cédric Jimenez and Duprey. The films stars Olivier Barthelemy, Mélanie Doutey and Francis Renaud.

The films follow a young anonymous hacker who discovers lost security camera footage of a recent terrorist attack at Gare d'Austerlitz in Paris. He decides to go after the culprit and discovers an unexpected plot.

Plot

A bomb attack takes place at Gare d'Austerlitz in Paris, killing several people a few days before the presidential election. The police is suspecting an Al-Qaeda satellite-group, the security camera footage is lost. A hacker with an interest in security cameras gets hold of the lost footage. He decides to use his wide access to security cameras all over Paris to track down the culprits. In doing so, he discovers that the plot is bigger than expected.

Cast 
  as Sam Cortès
 Mélanie Doutey as Nora
 Francis Renaud as Otar Mirko
 Féodor Atkine as Nicola Mirko
 Valérie Sibilia as Marie
 Batiste De Oliveira as Anonymous_26 / Martin
 Pascal Henault as Tueur
 Xavier Magot as David

Production
Paris Under Watch uses a fairly unusual approach by using only footage from security cameras and webcams for the video and phone recordings for the audio.

References

External links
 

2012 films
2010s French-language films
Films shot in Paris
French thriller films
Films about security and surveillance
2012 thriller films
Films directed by Cédric Jimenez
2010s French films